American ipecac may refer to several plant species:
Euphorbia ipecacuanhae; also known as Carolina ipecac
Gillenia stipulata